Vildledt Elskov is a 1911 Danish silent film directed by August Blom under the Nordisk Films banner.

Cast
Otto Lagoni -Bankdirektøren
Ella la Cour - Fruen
Clara Wieth - Datteren
Richard Christensen - Studenten
Lau Lauritzen Sr. - Charles
Julie Henriksen -Fabrikspigen
Emilie Sannom - T-jenestepigen
Svend Cathala
Gudrun Bruun Stephensen
Frederik Jacobsen

External links

1911 films
Danish silent films
Danish black-and-white films
Films directed by August Blom